The British Swimming Championships - relay winners formerly the (Amateur Swimming Association (ASA) National Championships) are listed below. 

The events were originally contested over yards and then switched to the metric conversion of metres in 1971.

+mixture of 110 and 220 yards

See also
British Swimming
List of British Swimming Championships champions

References

Swimming in the United Kingdom